Roanoke Rapids is a city in Halifax County, North Carolina, United States. The population was 15,754 at the 2010 census. It is the principal city of the Roanoke Rapids Micropolitan Statistical Area, and is also an anchor city of the Rocky Mount-Wilson-Roanoke Rapids CSA, with a total population of 297,726 as of 2018.

Geography
Roanoke Rapids is located in northern Halifax County at  (36.454528, -77.654822), bordered to the north by Northampton County, with the county line following the Roanoke River.

The town is located at the eastern edge of the North Carolina Piedmont, on the Roanoke River at the fall line, which marks the area where an upland region (continental bedrock) and a coastal plain (coastal alluvia) meet. The fall line is typically prominent where a river crosses it, for there will usually be rapids or waterfalls. Because of these features, riverboats normally could not travel any further inland. Because settlements needed a port and a ready supply of water power, they often developed where the river crosses the fall line. The Roanoke River and its falls inspired the development of Roanoke Rapids; businessmen such as Sam Patterson and other textile manufacturers used the river to power their mills.

The most prominent example of fall line settlement was the establishment of the cities along the eastern coast of the United States where the Appalachian Rise and the coastal plains meet.

The  Roanoke Rapids Canal trail starts at the Roanoke dam and ends roughly a mile after passing the historic aqueduct. The trail is fairly narrow, which limits access to walkers, runners, and bikers.

Climate

Demographics

2020 census

As of the 2020 United States census, there were 15,229 people, 6,051 households, and 3,761 families residing in the city.

2010 census
As of the census of 2010, there were 15,754 people, 6,437 households, and 4,180 families residing in the city. The population density was 2,019.7 people per square mile (776.1/km). There were 7,085 housing units at an average density of 908.3 per square mile (347.1/km). The racial makeup of the city was 63.6% White, 31.2% African American, 0.6% Native American, 1.7% Asian, 0.0% Pacific Islander, 1.7% from other races, and 1.3% from two or more races. Hispanic or Latino of any race were 3.2% of the population.

There were 6,437 households, out of which 30.9% had children under the age of 18 living with them, 39.9% were married couples living together, 19.7% had a female householder with no husband present, and 35.1% were non-families. 30.7% of all households were made up of individuals, and 12.0% had someone living alone who was 65 years of age or older. The average household size was 2.42 and the average family size was 3.01.

In the city, the population was spread out, with 21.7% under the age of 19, 5.9% from 20 to 24, 24.1% from 25 to 44, 26.1% from 45 to 64, and 14.8% who were 65 years of age or older. The median age was 37.9 years. For every 100 females, there were 84.84 males. For every 100 females age 18 and over, there were 79.51 males.

The median income for a household in the city was $35,388, and the median income for a family was $51,548 (2012 dollars). About 15.9% of families and 19.9% of individuals were below the poverty line, including 26.4% of those under age 18 and 10.1% of those age 65 or over.

Industry
The city was first settled as a mill town, being home to multiple textile mills. Crystal Lee Sutton (Jenkins), was a worker and union organizer for the J.P. Stevens & Co. mill in Roanoke Rapids, upon whose union activities the movie Norma Rae was based. All the textile mills are now closed and nearly 3,000 employees eventually lost their jobs. Roanoke Rapids is now home to a KapStone Paper and Packaging paper manufacturing facility.

Attractions
Roanoke Rapids is known for its many historical sites.  The original Roanoke Rapids High School building or Senior building as it is sometimes referred, opened in 1921 and is still in use. The building embodies many elements of Elizabethan Gothic and Tudor Revival architecture in its castle-like facade. It was built by industrialist Samuel Paterson and designed by renowned architect Hobart Upjohn in a modified H-design. Hobart Upjohn was the grandson of Richard Upjohn, architect of Christ Episcopal Church in Raleigh, North Carolina and Trinity Church, in New York, NY among other notable buildings.  The high school is the dominant building in the city's central core and is flanked by another castle-like structure which formerly housed a National Guard Armory. In addition to Roanoke Rapids High School, the Roanoke Canal and Roanoke Rapids Historic District are listed on the National Register of Historic Places.
 
The Roanoke Canal Museum and Trail is one of the city's oldest historical sites. The 1823 canal lock building has been adapted as a museum to show the significance of the canal system to American westward expansion.  It offers an in-depth look at the influential people who pushed for the Roanoke River to become a source of trade and navigation, as well as the commodities that were shipped and traded on the Roanoke River. The trail, over seven miles long, is adjacent to the museum and largely parallel to the Roanoke River. It is commonly used by runners, bikers, photographers, and wildlife admirers.  It is used as the course for the annual Roanoke Canal Half Marathon, and the Roanoke Canal Mountain Biking Club is located nearby.

Roanoke Rapids had planned Carolina Crossroads, an entertainment district founded by a group of local business developers.  Attractions were to include the Randy Parton Theater as an anchor for the development, an outdoor amphitheater, a campground, an aquarium, hotels, restaurants, outlet shopping, travel center, several other dinner theaters, and water park.  The association between the city and Randy Parton, brother of Dolly Parton, ended in December 2006.  The city renamed the theater as the Roanoke Rapids Theater. A Black Widow Billiards Center was also announced by the pool player, Jeanette Lee. Carolina Crossroads and the theater in particular became a controversial matter because of the city's financial exposure. After nearly a decade of failed attempts to lease or sell the theater, the city sold the theater on July 23, 2018.

Notable people
 James Anderson, former NFL linebacker
 Brian Barnes, former MLB left-handed pitcher
 John Armstrong Chaloner, writer
 James E. Cheek, university president
 Ron Davis, former MLB outfielder
 David J. Dorsett, vice admiral, Director of Naval Intelligence
 George Grizzard, actor
 Nazair Jones, former NFL defensive tackle
 Meredith Kinleigh, Christian musician
 Kareem Martin, NFL defensive end
 J'Vonne Parker, former NFL defensive tackle
 Crystal Lee Sutton, labor activist
 Tom Topping, former first team All-American football player at Duke University
 Fred Vaughan, former colligate football player at NC State University
 Michael H. Wray, member of the North Carolina General Assembly

See also
North Carolina Local Government Commission

Notes

References

External links

 City of Roanoke Rapids official website
 Roanoke Valley Chamber of Commerce

 Cities in North Carolina
 Cities in Halifax County, North Carolina
 Roanoke Rapids, North Carolina micropolitan area
 Company towns in North Carolina